Mexhit Neziri (born 2 September 1990), is a Macedonian football defender of Albanian descent who plays for FK Shkëndija.

Honours

Club
KF Shkëndija
 First Macedonian Football League: 2010–11
Macedonian Super Cup (1): 2011

References

 http://moldfootball.com/?index=news&news=22469  Moldfootball, Меджит Незири: "Я убежден, что у "Дачии" есть все шансы выиграть чемпионский титул" , August 10, 2015 
 http://moldfootball.com/?index=news&news=23778  Moldfootball, Меджит Незири: "Я думаю, уровень молдавского чемпионата на голову выше македонского" , February 2, 2016 
 http://www.macedonianfootball.com/index.php?option=com_content&view=article&id=7606:renova-sells-medzit-neziri-to-dacia&catid=33:international&Itemid=223   macedonianfootball, Medzit Neziri moves from Renova to Dacia, July 18, 2015 
 http://alsat-m.tv/News/205015/zyrtare-neziri-firmos-per-dy-vite-me-dacian    alsat-m, Zyrtare:Neziri firmor per dy vite me Dacian, July 20, 2015

External links
 
 Medjit Neziri at Footballdatabase

1990 births
Living people
Sportspeople from Tetovo
Association football fullbacks
Macedonian footballers
KF Shkëndija players
FK Renova players
FC Dacia Chișinău players
FK Ventspils players
Macedonian First Football League players
Moldovan Super Liga players
Latvian Higher League players
Macedonian expatriate footballers
Macedonian expatriate sportspeople in Moldova
Expatriate footballers in Moldova
Macedonian expatriate sportspeople in Latvia
Expatriate footballers in Latvia
Albanian footballers from North Macedonia